The Michigan Wolverines field hockey team is the intercollegiate field hockey program representing the University of Michigan. The school competes in the Big Ten Conference in Division I of the National Collegiate Athletic Association (NCAA). The Michigan field hockey team plays its home games at Phyllis Ocker Field on the university campus in Ann Arbor, Michigan. Michigan has won one NCAA Championship as well as eleven Big Ten regular season titles and eight Big Ten tournaments since the creation of the field hockey program in 1973. The team is currently coached by Marcia Pankratz.

History 
Field hockey has been a varsity sport at the University of Michigan since 1973. From 1978 to 1988 and again from 1992 to the present, Michigan has played in the Big Ten Conference. Between 1989 and 1991, the team played in the Midwestern Collegiate Field Hockey Conference. The team won a number of major championships during the late 1990s and early 2000s, beginning with a Big Ten regular season title in 1997 and a Big Ten tournament championship in 1999. This streak of successes under head coach Marcia Pankratz culminated with the team's first and to date only national championship in 2001. The achievement was the first NCAA title won by a women's sports team at the University of Michigan, and was also just the second time a Midwestern university had claimed the championship after Iowa had done it first in 1986.

Season-by-season results 

Season-by-season results through the end of the 2022 season

Coaching Staff

Awards and accolades

National championships
Michigan has accumulated a total of 11 appearances in the NCAA tournament, including three Final Fours. In 2001, the Wolverines won their first NCAA championship by defeating Maryland in the final by a score of 2–0. The victory made them the first women's team at the university to win a national championship, as well as the second field hockey team from the Midwest to earn the title, after Iowa in 1986.

Conference championships
Michigan has won eleven conference titles, all of them in the Big Ten Conference and all but one under the leadership of head coach Marcia Pankratz.

Conference Tournament Championships

All-Americans

Awards and accolades through the end of the 2022 season

Stadium 

Michigan has played its home games at Phyllis Ocker Field Hockey Field since its construction in 1995. The field is named after Phyllis Ocker, a former University of Michigan teacher, field hockey coach, and athletics administrator. In 2003, Ocker Field's AstroTurf playing surface was upgraded at the cost of $500,000. Between the end of the 2013 season and the start of the 2014 season, Ocker Field underwent substantial renovations that included the installation of a blue AstroTurf 12 playing surface and a permanent 1,500-seat grandstand, which tripled the stadium's capacity. In 2017 Ocker Field received a new playing surface with the installation of a Poligras Platinum CoolPlus field. Between the 2003 and 2014 renovations, the stadium had a seating capacity of 500. Before the construction of Ocker Field, the Michigan field hockey team had played at four other venues on campus: Michigan Stadium (1973–75), Ferry Field (1976–86), the Tartan Turf (1987–90), and Oosterbaan Fieldhouse (1991–94).

See also
List of NCAA Division I field hockey programs

References

External links